Baima is a town of Shizhong District, in the southwestern suburbs of Neijiang, Sichuan, People's Republic of China, situated on the northwestern (right) bank of the Tuo River about  from downtown.

, it has four residential neighborhoods and 13 villages under its administration:
Neighborhoods
Baima Street Community
Simaqiao Community
Huangshi Community
Chaotianmen Community

Villages
Dongjia Village
Qianzi Village
Lianhe Village
Shuanghe Village
Shipan Village
Shimiao Village
Baita Village
Jiupan Village
Haitang Village
Longdong Village
Bailayuan Village
Sanbianchong Village
Baxian Village

See also 
 List of township-level divisions of Sichuan

References 

Towns in Sichuan
Neijiang